John Boyle (born 25 December 1946) is a Scottish former footballer who played during the 1960s and 1970s.

Born in Motherwell, he signed for London club Chelsea as a 15-year-old whilst on holiday in the city. Boyle was one of the lesser-known, but nevertheless important, members of the successful Chelsea side of the period, usually playing in the midfield ball-winner role. He made his Chelsea debut in a League Cup semi-final against Aston Villa and ultimately picked up a winners' medal in that competition the same year after playing in Chelsea's two-legged final victory over Leicester City.

He played in Chelsea's FA Cup final loss to Tottenham Hotspur two years later but missed out due to injury when they won their FA Cup final against Leeds United in 1970. He made amends the following season, playing in both matches of Chelsea's successful Cup Winners' Cup final against Real Madrid in Athens.

Boyle spent two months on loan at Brighton & Hove Albion before leaving Chelsea in December 1973 to sign for Orient. He then joined the North American Soccer League expansion side Tampa Bay Rowdies in February 1975 just ahead of their indoor campaign. He captained Tampa Bay to a runner-up finish in the 1975 NASL Indoor tournament in March, and in August to victory in Soccer Bowl '75. Boyle retired in late 1975 and later had a brief spell coaching the Rowdies in 1977 after Eddie Firmani abruptly resigned from the post. In 1980–81 he appeared in five additional matches for Phoenix Inferno of the MISL.

References

External links
 NASL/MISL stats

1946 births
Living people
Footballers from Motherwell
Association football midfielders
Scottish footballers
Chelsea F.C. players
Leyton Orient F.C. players
Brighton & Hove Albion F.C. players
English Football League players
Scottish expatriate footballers
Expatriate soccer players in the United States
Scottish football managers
North American Soccer League (1968–1984) players
North American Soccer League (1968–1984) indoor players
Tampa Bay Rowdies (1975–1993) players
Major Indoor Soccer League (1978–1992) players
Phoenix Inferno players
North American Soccer League (1968–1984) coaches
Expatriate soccer managers in the United States
Tampa Bay Rowdies coaches
Scottish expatriate sportspeople in the United States